Broxaterol is a β2 adrenoreceptor agonist. It is part of a class of drugs that affect the smooth muscle receptors in the body, often in use cases for respiratory disease that respond to this type of treatment.

References

Secondary alcohols
Beta2-adrenergic agonists
Isoxazoles
Bromoarenes